= Spec Property Developments =

Australian real estate development organization

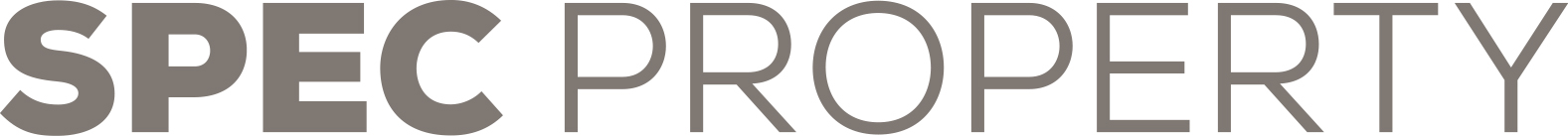
- Type: Private company
- Industry: Construction
- Founded: 1997; 29 years ago
- Founder: Sam Abdelmalak
- Headquarters: Melbourne, Australia
- Website: specproperty.com

Spec Property Developments is a major Australian Real estate development organization. The firm was founded in 1995, and has been involved in various notable development projects. Since 1997, the company has developed over $1 billion in residency projects.
